Kaliganj may refer to:

Localities in Bangladesh
Kaliganj Upazila, Gazipur
Kaliganj Upazila, Jhenaidah
Kaliganj Upazila, Lalmonirhat
Kaliganj Upazila, Satkhira

Localities in India
Kaliganj, Nadia, village in Nadia district, West Bengal
Kaliganj (community development block), administrative division in Nadia district, West Bengal  
Kaliganj (Vidhan Sabha constituency), constituency in West Bengal

Other uses
Kaliganj massacre